Jean-Pierre Guillet is a French-Canadian writer born in Iberville, Quebec, in 1953.

He received the 1998 Aurora Award for best science-fiction novel in French for the story of an expedition to Mars, L'Odyssée du Pénélope(The Odyssey of the Penelope). He was also nominated for the 2004 Aurora Award for La cage de Londres (The London Pen), a sequel to H.G.Wells' The War of the Worlds.

Bibliography
 
 IN FRENCH
  Le Paradis perdu, Saint-Lambert : Éditions Héritage, 1991, 
  La Poudre magique, Waterloo : Éditions Michel Quintin, 1992, 
 Mystère aux Îles-de-la-Madeleine, Waterloo : Éditions Michel Quintin, 1992,  
 Enquête sur la falaise, Waterloo : Éditions Michel Quintin, 1992,  
 La fête est à l'eau! Waterloo : Éditions Michel Quintin, 1993,  
 Destinées, Saint-Lambert : Éditions Héritage, 1993, 
 La Machine à bulles, Waterloo : Éditions Michel Quintin, 1994,  
 Tadam! Saint-Lambert : Éditions Héritage, 1995, 
 Mystère et boule de poil! Saint-Lambert : Éditions Héritage, 1995, 
 L'odyssée du Pénélope, Saint-Lambert : Éditions Héritage, 1997,  
  Opération Papillon, Montréal : Éditions Pierre Tisseyre, 1999, 
 Le Monstre du lac Champlain, Saint-Laurent : Éditions Pierre Tisseyre, 2000, 
 Les Visiteurs des ténèbres, Saint-Laurent : Éditions Pierre Tisseyre, 2001, 
 La Cage de Londres, Québec : Alire, 2003,  
 La Puce co(s)mique et le rayon bleuge , Saint-Alphonse-de-Granby : Éditions de la Paix, 2004, 
 Le Fils de Bougainville, Saint-Laurent : Éditions Pierre Tisseyre, 2004, 
 Le Monde du Lac-en-Ciel, Saint-Laurent : Éditions Pierre Tisseyre, 2006, 
 Les Pirates du Lac-en-Ciel, Rosemère : Éditions Pierre Tisseyre, 2011, 
 Enquête spatiale, Montréal : Médiaspaul, 2012,  
 SOS au lac des Glaces, Montréal ; Paris : Médiaspaul, 2013, 
 Le Catalogue de robots, Montréal : Bayard Canada livres, 2013. 
 Le Capitaine Poulet, Montréal : Bayard Canada livres, 2013, 
 L'Enfant des glaces, Montréal ; Paris : Médiaspaul, 2015, 
 SOS en Antarctique T.1: Le monde du Lac-des-glaces, Rosemère : Éditions Pierre Tisseyre, 2020, 
 Clash sous la glace T.2: Le monde du Lac-des-glaces, Rosemère : Éditions Pierre Tisseyre, 2022, 
 La bariolée de l'Île-Mère, Montréal : Québec-Amérique, 2022, 
 IN ENGLISH:
 The Magic Powder, 1992, 
 The Magdalen Islands Mystery, 1992, 
 The cliff case, 1992, 
 Castle Chaos, 1993, 
 The Bubble Machine, 1994,  
 The Odyssey of the Penelope, 2018, 
 The London pen, 2018,

References

External links 
 jeanpierreguillet.info

1953 births
Living people
Canadian science fiction writers
People from Montérégie
Writers from Quebec
20th-century Canadian novelists
21st-century Canadian novelists
20th-century Canadian male writers
21st-century Canadian male writers
Canadian novelists in French
Canadian male novelists